Kirill Emilevich Razlogov  (6 May 1946 – 26 September 2021) was a Russian film critic and cultural anthropologist. He was the President of the Russian Guild of Film Critics from March 2015 until his death.

Razlogov was born and died in Moscow. His grandfather (on the maternal side) was Soviet diplomat Alexander Bekzadyan.

He was the director of the Russian Institute for Cultural Research (1989-2013). He was an author and the host of Cult of Cinema, a program on TV channel Russia-K. He was also the author of fourteen books and about 600 scientific papers on the history of art and cinema, different cultural issues and author of articles on the history and theory of cinema in the Great Russian Encyclopedia.

Since 1999 (with a break in 2006-2008) he worked as the program director of the Moscow International Film Festival.

References

External links
 Страница Кирилла Разлогова на сайте телеканала «Культура»
 Страница Кирилла Разлогова на сайте Российского института культурологии
 Архив передачи «От киноавангарда до видеоарта»

1946 births
2021 deaths
Russian journalists
Russian film critics
Russian television presenters
Soviet art historians
Soviet male writers
20th-century male writers
21st-century male writers
Writers from Moscow
Journalists from Moscow
Russian art historians
Russian columnists
Moscow State University alumni
Academicians of the National Academy of Motion Picture Arts and Sciences of Russia
Communist Party of the Soviet Union members
Academicians of the Russian Academy of Cinema Arts and Sciences "Nika"
Chevaliers of the Ordre des Arts et des Lettres
Film theorists
Russian people of Bulgarian descent